The Amani sunbird (Hedydipna pallidigaster) is a species of bird in the family Nectariniidae.
It is found in Kenya and Tanzania.
Its natural habitats are subtropical or tropical moist lowland forests and subtropical or tropical moist montane forests. The male Amani sunbird has a white and dark-green feathered body while the female Amani sunbird has a yellow and grey plumage. Breeding season takes place from May to June and from September to December. The regular diet of the Amani sunbird consists of spiders, caterpillars and other flying insects.
It is threatened by habitat loss.

References

External links
BirdLife Species Factsheet.

Amani sunbird
Birds of East Africa
Amani sunbird
Amani sunbird
Taxonomy articles created by Polbot